James Ward Rector (June 24, 1903 – August 6, 1979) was an American jurist from Wisconsin.

Born in Glenwood, Missouri, Rector received his bachelor's degree and law degrees from the University of Wisconsin–Madison. He served as special counsel to the Governor of Wisconsin. In 1946, he was appointed to the Wisconsin Supreme Court, but was defeated in the election in 1947. Rector then served on the Wisconsin Public Service Commission and then resigned, in 1949, to become president of a bank and practiced law.

Notes

People from Schuyler County, Missouri
University of Wisconsin–Madison alumni
University of Wisconsin Law School alumni
Justices of the Wisconsin Supreme Court
1903 births
1979 deaths
20th-century American lawyers
20th-century American judges